Drunken style usually refers to martial arts performed as if under the influence of alcohol intoxication:
Drunken boxing
Drunken Monkey
The term may also refer to:
"Drunken Style", a song by Len from the 1997 album Get Your Legs Broke
"Drunken Style", a song by Squarepusher from the 1998 album Music Is Rotted One Note
"Drunken Style", a song by Brotha Lynch Hung and C-Bo from the 2001 album Blocc Movement
"Drunken Styles", a song by Snow from the 1993 album 12 Inches of Snow